Charles Jenkinson may refer to:

Charles Jenkinson, 1st Earl of Liverpool (1727–1808), British statesman
Charles Jenkinson, 3rd Earl of Liverpool (1784–1851), British politician
Sir Charles Jenkinson, 10th Baronet, MP for Dover, 1806–1818
Charles Moffatt Jenkinson (1865-1954), Australian politician
Charles Jenkinson (reverend) (1877-1949), Anglican clergyman and Labour Party social reformer